The Corpus Christi Sharks were a 2007 expansion member of the AF2, an arena American football development league.  They played their home games at the American Bank Center.  Michael Trigg was the team's head coach.  Trigg had been a head coach in the Arena Football League with the Milwaukee Mustangs, Grand Rapids Rampage and Philadelphia Soul, coaching  the Rampage to victory in ArenaBowl XV. The Sharks folded in October 2009.

The team is not to be confused with the Corpus Christi Hammerheads of the Indoor Football League, the American Bank Center's former tenant now playing again at the American Bank Center. Because the Sharks have since folded, there is not competition in trying to schedule games that might occur on the same day.

Season by season 

|-
|2007 || 6 || 10 || 0 || 3rd NC Southwest || --
|-
|2008 || 7 || 9 || 0 || 4th NC Southwest || --
|-
|2009 || 2 || 14 || 0 || 4th NC Southwest || --
|-
!Totals || 15 || 33 || 0
|colspan="2"|
|}

Roster

Coaches 
Michael Trigg 2007 Head Coach, Director of Football Operations
Luke Byrnes 2009 Offensive Coordinator
Quinn Cairo 2009 Defensive Coordinator
Johnny Flores 2007 Assistant Coach, OL/DL, FB/LB
Sven Offerson 2007 Equipment Manager

External links
Official website
Corpus Christi Sharks at ArenaFan.com

American football teams in Texas
Defunct af2 teams
Sports in Corpus Christi, Texas
Defunct American football teams in Texas
American football teams established in 2006
American football teams disestablished in 2009
2006 establishments in Texas
2009 disestablishments in Texas